Malaysia to Amnesia is a 2021 Indian Tamil-language comedy film written and directed by Radha Mohan. The film stars Vaibhav and Vani Bhojan in the lead roles, while Karunakaran, M. S. Bhaskar and Riya Suman play supporting roles. The music was composed by Premgi Amaren with editing by Praveen K. L. and cinematography by Mahesh Muthuswami.

The film was produced during the COVID-19 pandemic in India. It was streamed via ZEE5 on 28 May 2021 and received mostly positive reviews praising actor M. S. Bhaskar's comedy performance.

Plot 
Arun Kumar, who is an entrepreneur, is involved in an ugly extramarital affair with another woman Bhavana. He lies to his wife that he is going to Malaysia to attend a business-related meeting but only to spend time with his girlfriend Bhavana in Bangalore. Arun's relationship with Bhavana is exposed later when he falls in difficult circumstances.

Cast 
 Vaibhav as Arunkumar Krishnamoorthy
 Vani Bhojan as Sujatha (Arukaani)
 Riya Suman as Bhavana
 Karunakaran as Prabhu
 M. S. Bhaskar as Mannargudi Narayanan / Dong Lee
 Sachu as Grandmother
 Mayilsamy as Watchman
 Colgate Vedika as Nivi

References

External links 
 

2020s Tamil-language films
2021 comedy films
2021 films
Films directed by Radha Mohan
Indian comedy films